Les petits riens (French for "The Little Nothings") is a ballet in one act and three tableaux by Jean-Georges Noverre, with music by Wolfgang Amadeus Mozart and other unknown composers, first performed at the Academie Royale de Musique in Paris on 11 June 1778. The three tableaux are described in the Journal de Paris:

 l' Amour pris au filet et mis en cage. "Love caught in a net and put in a cage", performed by Mme Guimard, Auguste Vestris and a young child.
 Jeu de Colin-Maillard. The story of Jean Colin-Maillard was a legend about a warrior who fought on even with his eyes poked out. His name is the French word for the game Blind man's buff. The main role in this scene was performed by Jean Dauberval. Such playful scenery usually had flirtatious connotations, which is famously depicted by Fragonard in his painting Le Collin-Maillard. 
 Espieglerie de l'Amour. "Playfulness of love" is a pastoral scene about a woman, played by Mlle Asselin, disguised as a male shepherd. Two other shepherdesses, performed by Mlles Guimard and Allard, fall in love with the shepherd. Finally, to disenchant the two shepherdesses the imposter ends up revealing her breasts to them.

While Mozart was staying in Paris, Noverre asked him to compose a new score for a ballet that he had created in Vienna in 1767. The ballet was to be danced as an interlude in the new opera  (1771) by Niccolò Piccinni. The opera was a flop and closed after four performances. Although the ballet music was well-received, Mozart was not credited with it, and he was at the time little known in Paris.

The score, catalogued as K. Anh. 10/299b, was thought lost, but it was rediscovered in the Paris Opera's archives in the late 19th century and has since entered both the ballet and symphonic repertoire. The Passepied (nr. 11) in D major is reminiscent of the first movement of Tchaikovsky's Souvenir de Florence, Op. 70; a D minor version of the melody appears in bars 5 and 6. The motive derived from this is used throughout the piece.

Notes

External links
, includes a list of recordings and sound files
 
 ,  conducted by Willi Boskovsky

Ballets by Jean-Georges Noverre
Ballets by Wolfgang Amadeus Mozart
1778 compositions